Liam Michael Hughes (born 10 August 1992) is an English footballer who plays as an attacking midfielder or striker for  club Worksop Town. He previously played for Cambridge United in the Football League and for Inverness Caledonian Thistle in the Scottish Premiership, as well as for several non-league teams.

Club career
Born in Rotherham, Hughes joined Cambridge United's youth setup from Scunthorpe United in 2007, aged 15. Initially a defender, he was converted to a more attacking role during his time at the Academy, and made his first-team debut on 9 November 2010, coming on as a late substitute in a 1–1 draw at home to Grimsby Town.

On 4 April 2011 Hughes signed a two-year professional deal with Cambridge United, but struggled to appear regularly as a starter. On 21 November 2012 he was loaned to Corby Town for a month, and after scoring six goals in five matches he returned to Cambridge.

Hughes signed a new two-and-a-half-year contract with the club on 30 January 2014. He was a member of the starting eleven for the 2014 FA Trophy Final as Cambridge beat Gosport Borough 4–0, and his headed goal opened the scoring in that season's play-off final in which Cambridge beat Gateshead 2–1 to gain promotion to the Football League. He played his first Football League match on 16 August, starting in a 2–1 loss away to Portsmouth. His contract with Cambridge United was cancelled by mutual consent on 30 January 2016, and Hughes signed for Inverness Caledonian Thistle of the Scottish Premiership two days later.

In June 2016 he joined Barrow. He moved on to Guiseley in November 2017, before signing for Billericay Town in February 2018.

On 16 May 2018 he joined Darlington. He left by mutual consent on 7 March 2019 and signed for Gainsborough Trinity the same day.

Hughes left Gainsborough in July 2019 and signed for Stratford Town, once again linking up with Darlington manager Tommy Wright. He left Stratford in October and signed for Bradford Park Avenue; he made his debut on 12 October in a 3–2 defeat at home to Hereford. In February 2020, he joined Frickley Athletic on dual registration. 

Hughes signed for Matlock Town ahead of the 2020–21 season, and spent two years with the club, less a month on loan at Kettering Town while the Northern Premier League was under lockdown in early 2021. He then moved on to Worksop Town.

Career statistics

Honours
Cambridge United
FA Trophy: 2013–14

References

External links
Profile at the Cambridge United F.C. website

1992 births
Living people
Footballers from Rotherham
English footballers
Association football midfielders
Scunthorpe United F.C. players
Cambridge United F.C. players
Corby Town F.C. players
Inverness Caledonian Thistle F.C. players
Barrow A.F.C. players
Guiseley A.F.C. players
Billericay Town F.C. players
Darlington F.C. players
Gainsborough Trinity F.C. players
Stratford Town F.C. players
Bradford (Park Avenue) A.F.C. players
Frickley Athletic F.C. players
Matlock Town F.C. players
Kettering Town F.C. players
Worksop Town F.C. players
National League (English football) players
English Football League players
Scottish Professional Football League players
Isthmian League players
Northern Premier League players
Southern Football League players